Sheila Solon (born c. 1959) is an American politician. She is a member of the Missouri House of Representatives, having served for the 9th district since January 2019. She is a member of the Republican party. Solon previously served in the Missouri House as a representative of the 31st district from 2011 to 2017.

Electoral history

State Representative

References

1950s births
21st-century American politicians
21st-century American women politicians
Living people
Republican Party members of the Missouri House of Representatives
People from Blue Springs, Missouri
Women state legislators in Wisconsin
Women state legislators in Missouri